The South Sydney City Council was a local government area covering the inner-eastern and inner-Southern Sydney suburbs of Sydney. It was forcibly merged with the Sydney City Council by the New South Wales State Government in 2004. The council chambers were located in the Erskineville Town Hall, with the administrative offices at Joynton Avenue in Zetland. The administrative offices were relocated to the TNT tower building in Redfern in 2001.

History

First creation, 1968–1981
The forerunner of the City of South Sydney was the Northcott Municipal Council (named after the late Governor Sir John Northcott, who served from 1946 to 1957 as the first Australian Governor of NSW), which was created on 1 January 1968 when the City of Sydney boundaries were changed. Newtown, Darlington, Erskineville, Alexandria, Waterloo and Redfern were combined to form the new council. The council was renamed the South Sydney Municipal Council on 1 December 1968, which was itself abolished on 1 January 1982 and all of these areas were returned to the City of Sydney.

Second creation, 1989–2004
In the late 1980s the New South Wales State Government perceived that the Sydney City Council was insufficiently committed to some major infrastructural projects such as the monorail and the redevelopment of Darling Harbour. In March 1987 the New South Wales State Government dismissed the Council of the City of Sydney and replaced it with commissioners appointed by the NSW Government who administered the city until 31 December 1988. A special inquiry and subsequent report (the Goran Report) advocated separating the central business district (CBD) from surrounding suburbs and replacing municipal government in the CBD with a special commission to ensure it was governed as a financial, commercial and tourist centre. In 1989, a new South Sydney City Council was created with the pre-1982 areas but also including most of Surry Hills and the eastern side of the City from the Domain to Boundary Road, including Woolloomooloo and Kings Cross, Potts Point and Elizabeth Bay which had not previously been a part of South Sydney.

The South Sydney City Council was established on 1 January 1989 under the City of Sydney Act 1988 with nine aldermen (Councillors from 1993) divided across three wards: North, South and East wards. The first election for the City of South Sydney was held on 3 December 1988.

In 2002, parts of the City of South Sydney and Leichhardt were proposed to be merged with the City of Sydney. In 2003, Potts Point, Elizabeth Bay, Kings Cross, Darlinghurst, Chippendale, Ultimo, and parts of Rushcutters Bay, Camperdown and Darlington were transferred from South Sydney to the City of Sydney. As the financial viability of the residual City of South Sydney was under threat as a result, the City of Sydney and the City of South Sydney were combined by proclamation on 6 February 2004. The 2003 merger was perceived as an attempt to bring more working class Labor Party voters into the City of Sydney.

Mayors

Northcott/South Sydney Municipality, 1968–1982

City of South Sydney, 1989–2004

References

South Sydney
Northcott
South Sydney
South Sydney
South Sydney
South Sydney